The year 1917 in radio involved some significant events.

Events
 6 April – The United States enters World War I and by presidential order all the country's radio stations are taken over for naval use.
 Edwin Howard Armstrong, working as a captain in the Signal Corps (United States Army) in Paris, perfects the eight-tube superheterodyne circuit.
 Radio San Paolo, the Regia Marina (Italian Navy) Radiotelegraphic Station, is established in Rome.

Births
 20 Marc0 – Vera Lynn, English singer (d. 2020)
 15 June – Charles Chilton, English radio presenter and producer (d. 2013)
 6 SeptemberRichard Durham, author and producer of Destination Freedom

References

 
Radio by year